John Dryden (1631–1700) was an influential English poet, literary critic, translator and playwright.

John Dryden may also refer to:

Politicians
John Dryden (died 1708) ( – 1708), English MP for Huntingdonshire
John Dryden (Ontario politician) (1840–1909), farmer and politician
John C. Dryden (1893–1952), Manitoba politician
John F. Dryden (1839–1911), New Jersey politician and founder of the Prudential Insurance Company 
Sir John Dryden, 2nd Baronet ( – ), English MP for Northamptonshire
John Dryden Kuser (1897–1964), New Jersey politician

Others
John Dryden (English footballer) or Jackie Dryden (1919–2004), English association footballer
John Dryden (footballer), New Zealand association footballer
John Dryden (writer, died 1701) ( – 1701), son of the poet and a minor playwright